Mmashoro is a village in Central District of Botswana. It is located 80 km north-west of Serowe. and the population was 1,543 in 2001 census. Mmashoro People did their shopping at serowe village.

References

Populated places in Central District (Botswana)
Villages in Botswana